Maria Semyonovna Kikh (1914-1979) was a Soviet Ukrainian politician (Communist).

She served as deputy chairperson of the Highest Soviet in the Ukraine SSR.

References

1914 births
1979 deaths
20th-century Ukrainian women politicians
Soviet women in politics
Ukrainian communists